Norton Knatchbull is the name of:

Sir Norton Knatchbull (MP for Hythe) (1569–1636), MP for Hythe, 1609
Sir Norton Knatchbull, 1st Baronet (1602–1685), English MP for Kent and New Romney
Norton Knatchbull, 6th Baron Brabourne (1922–1943), British peer and soldier
Norton Knatchbull, 3rd Earl Mountbatten of Burma (born 1947), British peer

See also
The Norton Knatchbull School, English secondary school in Kent